Major-General Christopher Mark Morrice Man  (20 April 1914 – 25 October 1989) was a British Army officer.

Military career
Educated at Eastbourne College and Emmanuel College, Cambridge, Man was commissioned into the Middlesex Regiment on 22 June 1934. After serving with the 1st Battalion, Middlesex Regiment in the Second World War, he became commanding officer of the Army Air Transport Training and Development Centre in 1953, commanding officer of the Infantry Junior Leaders' Battalion in 1957 and commander of 125th Infantry Brigade in December 1959. He went on to be British military attaché in Seoul in 1962 and General Officer Commanding 49th (North Midlands and West Riding) Division and North Midland District of the Territorial Army in February 1964 before retiring in December 1966.

He was colonel of the Middlesex Regiment from 1965 to 1966.

References

1914 births
1989 deaths
British Army generals
Companions of the Order of the Bath
Officers of the Order of the British Empire
Recipients of the Military Cross
Middlesex Regiment officers
British Army personnel of World War II
British military attachés
Alumni of Emmanuel College, Cambridge
People from Dover District
Military personnel from Kent